Patriarch Thomas may refer to:

 Thomas I of Constantinople, Patriarch of Constantinople in 607–610
 Thomas II of Constantinople, Patriarch of Constantinople in 667–669